Justice Pearce may refer to:

Edward Pearce, Baron Pearce, Lord Justice of Appeal from 1957 to 1962
James Alfred Pearce (judge), judge of the Maryland Court of Appeals
John A. Pearce, associate justice of the Utah Supreme Court
Robert Pearce (judge), associate justice of the Supreme Court of Tasmania

See also
Justice Pierce (disambiguation)